Markéta Konvičková (born 17 May 1994) is a Czech Český slavík-winning singer. She was a finalist in the first season of SuperStar and won the "New Artist" award at the 2010 Český slavík awards.

Discography

Studio albums
2010: Na šňůře perel
2011: Kafe, bar a nikotin
2013: Tablo
2015: Má přání k Vánocům

Compilation albums 
 2017: Já

Awards and nominations

References

External links

1994 births
Living people
21st-century Czech women singers
Musicians from Třinec